The third government of Israel was formed by David Ben-Gurion on 8 October 1951, more than two months after the elections. His Mapai party formed a coalition with Mizrachi, Hapoel HaMizrachi, Agudat Yisrael, Poalei Agudat Yisrael and the three Israeli Arab parties, the Democratic List for Israeli Arabs, Progress and Work and Agriculture and Development. There were 15 ministers.

Agudat Yisrael and Poalei Agudat Yisrael left the coalition on 23 September 1952 (though Kalman Kahana remained a deputy minister) shortly after disagreements over the conscription of women into the IDF. This left the government with only 60 of the 120 seats in the Knesset.

The government resigned on 19 December 1952 due to a dispute with the religious parties over religious education.

Two ministers, Eliezer Kaplan and David-Zvi Pinkas died in office.

References

External links
Knesset 2: Government 3 Knesset website

 03
1951 establishments in Israel
1952 disestablishments in Israel
Cabinets established in 1951
Cabinets disestablished in 1952
1951 in Israeli politics
1952 in Israeli politics
 03